Brand Spankin' New is an album by American keyboardist and composer Wayne Horvitz' band Zony Mash recorded in 1998 and released on the independent Knitting Factory label.

Reception
The Allmusic review by Solar Marquardt awarded the album 4 stars stating "The album features a confident, slightly more laid-back sound than their earlier material. The tracks are longer, averaging five to six minutes a piece, yet excellent improvisation and orchestration prevents them from becoming monotonous".

Track listing
All compositions by Wayne Horvitz except as indicated
 "Slide By" - 7:11 
 "Brand Spankin' New" - 3:58 
 "Chimacum After Hours" - 4:56 
 "Meet the Zony Mash" - 5:15 
 "Electric Sandworm" (Timothy Young) - 6:01 
 "Bad Traffic" - 4:30 
 "Cadillac Ranch" - 7:13 
 "Stompin' at the Cranium" - 6:39 
Recorded at Chimacum After Hours in 1998

Personnel
Wayne Horvitz - Hammond B-3 organ, Nord Lead, DX-7, Moog Source, Wurlitzer electric piano
Timothy Young - guitar
Fred Chalenor - electric bass
Andy Roth - drums

References

Knitting Factory Records albums
Wayne Horvitz albums
1998 albums